The Kakadu pebble-mound mouse (Pseudomys calabyi) is a rodent native to Australia. It is one of the pebble-mound mice.

References

Pseudomys
Mammals of the Northern Territory
Rodents of Australia
Mammals described in 1987
Endemic fauna of Australia
Arnhem Land tropical savanna